Flying Saucer Daffy is a 1958 short subject directed by Jules White starring American slapstick comedy team The Three Stooges (Moe Howard, Larry Fine and Joe Besser). It is the 187th entry in the series released by Columbia Pictures starring the comedians, who released 190 shorts for the studio between 1934 and 1959.

Plot
Similar to Cinderella, Joe Stooge is forced to work for his Aunt and two bum cousins (Moe and Larry). On a camping trip, Joe's accidental snapshot of a paper plate blown by a breeze, is mistaken for a picture of a UFO. However, Moe and Larry take the credit for the photo, and are paid a huge sum while Joe is reduced to the status of their servant. Moe and Larry are arrested when their UFO picture is revealed to be a fraud by the government. Angered, the Aunt banishes Joe for causing the arrests of both Moe and Larry. Joe isolates himself with a camping trip, only to meet two genuine and beautiful aliens from Planet Zircon who allow him to photograph them. Moe and Larry are released from jail briefly on probation to allow them to pay back the government for the fraudulent photo, when Joe arrived with the great news, in which the other stooges don't believe, and repeatedly strike Joe, until Joe manages to strike both stooges and the older woman unconsciously.  Joe becomes a national hero, celebrating his photo achievement while riding with his new beautiful aliens in a ticker-tape parade; Moe and Larry are put in straitjackets and incarcerated in a psychiatric hospital.

Production notes
Flying Saucer Daffy  features Moe and Larry's more "gentlemanly" haircuts, first suggested by Joe Besser. However, these had to be used sparingly, as most of the shorts with Besser were remakes of earlier films, and new footage had to be matched with old. Besser later reported that Flying Saucer Daffy was his favorite Stooge comedy. The short features stock footage from Earth vs the Flying Saucers.

Over the course of their careers at Columbia Pictures, the Stooges would very occasionally be cast as separate characters. This course of action always worked against the team, as author Jon Solomon contends: "When the writing divides them, they lose their comic dynamic." In addition to this split occurring in Flying Saucer Daffy, the trio also played separate characters in Woman Haters, He Cooked His Goose (and its remake Triple Crossed), Gypped in the Penthouse, Cuckoo on a Choo Choo and Sweet and Hot, as well as the feature film Rockin' in the Rockies.

End of an era
Though Flying Saucer Daffy was not the last short subject released by the Stooges (that honor goes to Sappy Bull Fighters), it was the last one produced. Filming took place on December 19–20, 1957. Several hours after filming wrapped, the two-reel-comedy unit shut down and the Stooges were unceremoniously fired from Columbia Pictures after 24 years. Joan Howard Maurer, daughter of Moe Howard, wrote the following in 1982:

See also
 List of American films of 1958

References

External links
 
 
 Flying Saucer Daffy at threestooges.net

1958 films
1950s science fiction comedy films
American black-and-white films
American science fiction comedy films
American space adventure films
Films directed by Jules White
Columbia Pictures short films
The Three Stooges films
1958 comedy films
1950s English-language films
1950s American films